The following highways are numbered 292:

Japan
 Japan National Route 292

United States
  Arkansas Highway 292
  Florida State Road 292
  Georgia State Route 292
  Maryland Route 292
  Minnesota State Highway 292
  Nevada State Route 292
  New Mexico State Road 292
  New York State Route 292
  North Carolina Highway 292 (former)
  Ohio State Route 292
  Pennsylvania Route 292
  South Carolina Highway 292
  Tennessee State Route 292
 Texas:
  Texas State Highway 292 (former)
  Texas State Highway Loop 292
  Farm to Market Road 292
  Utah State Route 292
  Virginia State Route 292
  Washington State Route 292